The Nokia Lumia 820 is a smartphone designed, developed and marketed by Nokia. It is the successor to the Lumia 800 and is one of the first Nokia phones to implement Windows Phone 8 alongside the Nokia Lumia 920. Although sharing a similar appearance with the Lumia 800, the Lumia 820 is a major overhaul over its predecessor, sporting a  diagonal OLED display with scratch resistant glass, though lacking Gorilla Glass protection, 1.5 GHz dual-core processor, and an 8.7-megapixel camera. The phone will come with LTE connectivity and a wireless-charging option. The 820 is the first Nokia Windows Phone OS based smartphone to embed a microSD card slot.

On October 9, 2012, the largely similar Nokia Lumia 810 was presented. The main differences are more talk time (10.2 hours) due to the larger 1800 mAh battery, an improved 1.3-megapixel front-facing camera, lighter weight, wider and longer dimensions. The Lumia 810 is exclusively made available to T-Mobile customers in the United States, and as such does not support LTE but only HSPA+, as LTE was not supported in T-Mobile's US network at the time of release.

On October 29, 2012, another variant of the Lumia 820, the Nokia Lumia 822 was announced, having a better front camera, larger battery and double the storage. It is exclusively available for Verizon customers.

Swappable rear Shells
The phone features a range of back 'Shells' which will allow users to customise the look of their phone as well as adding functionality such as Wireless charging, if a shell with that capability is added. This feature gives the additional benefit of allowing a scuffed or broken shell to be replaced with a new one to freshen up the device, something which is not possible on some competing smartphones such as the iPhone or unibody Lumia designs such as the 900 and 920. It additionally allows user access to the battery so that a battery which no longer holds a charge can be replaced with a new one, or, if on a long trip away from a charger, the user to swap a spare fully charged battery for an empty one, increasing the time the phone can be used for.

Reception
Jeff Parsons from Techradar wrote: "The Nokia Lumia 820 sits nicely at the crossroads between value and power. While it doesn't have the processor, camera or larger screen of its big brother the Lumia 920, it does have microSD storage, removable covers and a more attractive price tag."

Mike Jennings from PC Pro wrote: "The low-resolution screen, weaker camera and continued lack of apps mean it can’t compete with the best Android handsets, but the usability of Windows 8 and attractive physical design mean this well-balanced Nokia is still an attractive proposition."

Stuart Miles from Pocket-Lint.com wrote: "This is the phone Nokia should be putting all its efforts into promoting. Agreed it isn’t the flagship and agreed the camera isn't nearly anywhere as good as on the 920, but this is a phone you'll be happy to use, a phone you'll enjoy using, and besides a lack of third-party apps at the moment, a phone that for many people will be a fantastic phone they will enjoy for the next two years."

Model variants

See also 

Microsoft Lumia

References

External links
 

Nokia 820 Specifications

Microsoft Lumia
Windows Phone devices
Mobile phones introduced in 2012
Discontinued smartphones
Videotelephony
Nokia smartphones
Mobile phones with user-replaceable battery